In 1955, the Brooklyn Dodgers finally fulfilled the promise of many previous Dodger teams. Although the club had won several pennants in the past, and had won as many as 105 games in 1953, it had never won a World Series. This team finished 13.5 games ahead in the National League pennant race, leading the league in both runs scored and fewest runs allowed. In the 1955 World Series, they finally beat their crosstown rivals, the New York Yankees. It was the Dodgers first and only World Series championship won while located in Brooklyn.

Offseason 
 October 8, 1954: Ray Moore was traded by the Dodgers to the Baltimore Orioles for Chico García.
 December 13, 1954: Billy Cox and Preacher Roe were traded by the Dodgers to the Baltimore Orioles for Johnny Jancse, Harry Schwegeman and cash.
 March 17, 1955: Erv Palica was traded by the Dodgers to the Baltimore Orioles for Frank Kellert and cash.

Regular season 

This season was basically a culmination of the careers of many legendary Dodger players. Catcher Roy Campanella won the 1955 National League Most Valuable Player award, his third in five years. Center fielder Duke Snider led the league in runs batted in and was second in the MVP voting. He also hit his 200th career home run on May 10. Jackie Robinson and Pee Wee Reese, both 36 years old, could still play. Gil Hodges, 31, hit 27 home runs (and drove in both Dodger runs in the seventh game of the Series), while Carl Furillo, 33, hit 26 home runs with a .314 batting average.

The pitching staff was anchored by Don Newcombe, who was 20–5. It was the first time a black pitcher had won 20 games in a season. The 22-year-old Johnny Podres was only 9–10 but became the hero of the 1955 World Series by shutting out the Yankees in the seventh game.

MVP controversy 
Duke Snider finished second to teammate Campanella in the MVP voting by just five points, 226–221, with each man receiving eight first place votes. The voting then as now was conducted by the Baseball Writers' Association of America. Each voting member, one from each major league city, filled out a ballot selecting ten men. A player receiving a first place vote got 14 points, then values of 9–8–7–6–5–4–3–2–1 for those in places 2 through 10. A writer from Philadelphia who was sick and who had become hospitalized had turned in a ballot with Campanella listed in position number 1 as well as position number 5. The assumption had been that the writer had meant to write Snider's name into one of those slots. Unable to get a clarification from the ill writer the BBWAA, after considering disallowing the ballot, decided to accept it, count the first place vote for Campanella and count the fifth place vote as though it were left blank. Had the ballot been disallowed, the vote would have been won by Snider by three points. Had Snider gotten the fifth place vote, the final vote would have favored Snider 227–226. Duke did, however, win the Sporting News National League Player of the Year Award for 1955 and the Sid Mercer Award.

Season standings

Record vs. opponents

Opening Day Lineup

Notable transactions 
 June 7, 1955: Ron Negray was traded by the Dodgers to the Philadelphia Phillies for Dave Cole and cash.
 June 9, 1955: Joe Black was traded by the Dodgers to the Cincinnati Reds for Bob Borkowski and cash.
 September 12, 1955: Glenn Cox was purchased from the Dodgers by the Kansas City Athletics.

Roster

Player stats

Batting

Starters by position 
Note: Pos = Position; G = Games played; AB = At bats; R = Runs; H = Hits; Avg. = Batting average; HR = Home runs; RBI = Runs batted in; SB = Stolen bases

Other batters 
Note: G = Games played; AB = At bats; R = Runs; H = Hits; Avg. = Batting average; HR = Home runs; RBI = Runs batted in; SB = Stolen bases

Pitching

Starting pitchers 
Note: G = Games pitched; GS = Games started; CG = Complete games; IP = Innings pitched; W = Wins; L = Losses; ERA = Earned run average; BB = Bases on balls; SO = Strikeouts

Other pitchers 
Note: G = Games pitched; GS = Games started; CG = Complete games; IP = Innings pitched; W = Wins; L = Losses; ERA = Earned run average; BB = Bases on balls; SO = Strikeouts

Relief pitchers 
Note: G = Games pitched; IP = Innings pitched; W = Wins; L = Losses; SV = Saves; ERA = Earned run average; BB = Bases on balls; SO = Strikeouts

1955 World Series

Game 1 
September 28, 1955, at Yankee Stadium in New York

Game 2 
September 29, 1955, at Yankee Stadium in New York

Game 3 
September 30, 1955, at Ebbets Field in Brooklyn, New York

Game 4 
October 1, 1955, at Ebbets Field in Brooklyn, New York

Game 5 
October 2, 1955, at Ebbets Field in Brooklyn, New York

Game 6 
October 3, 1955, at Yankee Stadium in New York

Game 7 
October 4, 1955, at Yankee Stadium in New York

Awards and honors 
National League Most Valuable Player
Roy Campanella
World Series Most Valuable Player
Johnny Podres
TSN Manager of the Year Award
Walter Alston
TSN Executive of the Year Award
Walter O'Malley
TSN Major League Player of the Year Award
Duke Snider
TSN National League Player of the Year Award
Duke Snider

All-Stars 
1955 Major League Baseball All-Star Game
Duke Snider starter
Roy Campanella reserve
Gil Hodges reserve
Don Newcombe reserve
TSN Major League All-Star Team
Don Newcombe
Roy Campanella
Duke Snider

League top five finishers 
Roy Campanella
 #4 in NL in batting average (.318)

Jim Gilliam
 #5 in NL in runs scored (110)
 #5 in NL in stolen bases (15)

Clem Labine
 #3 in NL in saves (11)

Don Newcombe
 #2 in NL in wins (20)
 #2 in NL in ERA (3.20)
 #2 in NL in complete games (17)
 #5 in NL in strikeouts (143)

Ed Roebuck
 #2 in NL in saves (12)

Duke Snider
 MLB leader in RBI (136)
 MLB leader in runs scored (126)
 #2 in NL in on-base percentage (.418)
 #2 in NL in slugging percentage (.628)
 #3 in NL in doubles (34)
 #3 in NL in bases on balls (104)
 #4 in NL in home runs (42)

Farm system

Notes

References 
Baseball-Reference season page
Baseball Almanac season page

External links 
1955 Brooklyn Dodgers uniform
Brooklyn Dodgers reference site
Acme Dodgers page 
Retrosheet
Hometown Piece for Messrs. Alston and Reese by Marianne Moore

Brooklyn Dodgers
Los Angeles Dodgers seasons
Brooklyn Dodgers season
National League champion seasons
World Series champion seasons
Jackie Robinson
1955 in sports in New York City
1950s in Brooklyn
Flatbush, Brooklyn